The Northern Ireland Liberal Democrats (Ulster-Scots: Norlin Airlann Leeberal Democrats), is a local party of the Liberal Democrats that operates in Northern Ireland. Unlike its counterparts in England, Scotland and Wales, the Northern Ireland party is not a state party within the federal Liberal Democrats (though there does exist constitutional provision for it to be established so by conference) but a local party similar to constituency parties in the rest of the UK.

Elections
The Liberal Democrats do not presently contest elections in Northern Ireland but there is a strong history of support to the Alliance Party.

Members
Several individuals, including former Alliance Party leader David Ford, hold membership of both the Alliance Party and the Liberal Democrats. Alliance members of the House of Lords take the Liberal Democrat whip on non-Northern Ireland issues. John Alderdice was leader of Alliance 1987–1998 and has sat as a Lib Dem peer since 1996.

Alliance Party MP Naomi Long (2010–2015) did not take the Liberal Democrat Whip in the House of Commons as she is not a Liberal Democrat member, and sits on the opposition benches.

As of 23 January 2016, the Chair of the Northern Ireland local party is Stephen Glenn. The previous chair was John O’Neill.

See also
Liberal Democrats
English Liberal Democrats
Scottish Liberal Democrats
Welsh Liberal Democrats
Alliance Party of Northern Ireland

References

External links
Northern Ireland Liberal Democrats - official blog
Northern Ireland Liberal Democrats - official Facebook group
Liberal Youth Northern Ireland - Facebook group

Organisation of the Liberal Democrats (UK)
Liberal parties in the United Kingdom